Nigerian Daily Sketch is a Newspaper published in Ibadan, South West Nigeria with a circulation of 60,000 throughout the country.

Reference 

Newspapers published in Nigeria